Dąbrowa  is a village in the administrative district of Gmina Damasławek, within Wągrowiec County, Greater Poland Voivodeship, in west-central Poland.

The village has a population of 390.

In 1815-1906 the name of the village was Dombrowo, and in 1906-1918 and 1939-1945 it was called Dornbrunn, see.

References

Villages in Wągrowiec County